The 2021–22 San Jose Sharks season was the 31st season for the National Hockey League franchise that was established on May 9, 1990.

General manager Doug Wilson took medical leave beginning on November 26, 2021, and would resign from the role on April 7, 2022, ending a 19-season tenure with the team. Assistant general manager Joe Will had already been serving as acting general manager since Wilson took medical leave, and will continue to do so until the team finds a permanent candidate for the role. On April 14, the Sharks were eliminated from playoff contention after losing to the Chicago Blackhawks.

Standings

Divisional standings

Conference standings

Schedule and results

Preseason
The schedule was announced on August 4, 2021.

Regular season
The schedule was announced on July 22, 2021, and was tentative pending on whether the league and the International Olympic Committee reach a deal to send players to the 2022 Winter Olympics. If no deal would have been reached, then an alternative schedule without an Olympics break would have been released and up to 16 of the team's home dates would have been rescheduled. An agreement was made on September 3, 2021. However, on December 22, 2021, the NHL decided to skip the Olympics due to a rise of COVID-19 cases. In place of missing the Olympics, the NHL used that time to reschedule postponed regular season games.

Player statistics

Skaters

Goaltenders

†Denotes player spent time with another team before joining the Sharks. Stats reflect time with the Sharks only.
‡Denotes player was traded mid-season. Stats reflect time with the Sharks only.

Transactions
The Sharks have been involved in the following transactions during the 2021–22 season.

Trades

Players acquired

Players lost

Signings

Draft picks

Below are the San Jose Sharks' selections at the 2021 NHL Entry Draft, which will be held on July 23 to 24, 2021. It will be held virtually via Video conference call from the NHL Network studio in Secaucus, New Jersey.

Notes:
 The San Jose Sharks' second-round pick went to the Ottawa Senators as the result of a trade on September 13, 2018, that sent Erik Karlsson and Francis Perron to San Jose in exchange for Chris Tierney, Dylan DeMelo, Josh Norris, Rudolfs Balcers, a conditional second-round pick in 2019, a conditional l first-round pick in 2019 or 2020, a conditional first-round pick no later than 2022, and this pick (being conditional at the time of the trade). The condition – Ottawa will receive a second-round pick in 2021 if Karlsson re-signs with the Sharks for the 2019–20 NHL season and the Sharks do not make the 2019 Stanley Cup Finals – was converted on June 17, 2019, when Karlsson re-signed with San Jose for the 2019–20 NHL season.
 The St. Louis Blues' third and sixth-round pick went to the San Jose Sharks as a result of a trade on July 24, 2021, that sent the Sharks' third-round pick to the Blues.
 The Toronto Maple Leafs' fourth-round pick went to the San Jose Sharks as a result of a trade on April 11, 2021, that sent Nick Foligno to Toronto.
 The Colorado Avalanche's fifth-round pick went to the San Jose Sharks as a result of a trade on April 10, 2021, that sent Devan Dubnyk to Colorado in exchange for Greg Pateryn.

Awards

Notes

References

San Jose Sharks seasons
Sharks
San Jose Sharks
San Jose Sharks